Shakal Sandhya (English: Day Night) is a 2005 Bengali drama romance film directed by Swapan Saha and produced by Subrato Saha Ray. The film features actors Prosenjit Chatterjee and Rachana Banerjee in the lead roles. Music of the film has been composed by Ashok Bhadra. The film was a remake of Tamil film Unnidathil Ennai Koduthen.

Plot 
This is a story about an innocent girl Anjali she stayed with her father Binoy Roychowdhury and her stepmother Madhobi. Anjali was a poor girl. On the other side a thief, Joy stole a gold statue of a god with his assistant Bhoja they take shelter at Anjali's house. Joy stayed three days at Anjali's house and her fell in love with Anjali. Joy come to know about Anjali's past life from her diary. On the other side Madhobi blamed Anjali as a thief, Madhobi threw out Anjali from home. Joy helped Anjali to become a singer. One day Madhobi realised her fault and came to meet Anjali. Joy convinced every one of Anjali's family to stay with her. Another guy Sandip liked Anjali. Anjali's family fixed her marriage with Sandip. Madhobi blamed Joy as a thief and threw him out from her house. Anjali tried to find out Joy. At the moment of a function Anjali told the whole story of her life to the audience and proposed to Joy and accepted him.

Cast 
 Prosenjit Chatterjee as Joy
 Rachana Banerjee as Anjali
 Subhasish Mukhopadhyay as Bhoja (Joy's Friend)
 Abhishek Chatterjee as Sandip
 Bodhisattwa Majumdar as Binoy Roy Choudhury, Anjali's father
 Bhaswar Chattopadhyay
 Kanchan Mullick as Bheema, the local goon
 Premjit Mukherjee as News Anchor
 Sanghamitra Bandyopadhyay as Madhobi Roy Choudhury, Anjali's step-mother
 Shantilal Mukherjee

Soundtrack is composed by Ashok Bhadra. Lyrics are written by Goutam Sushmit.

Akashe Surjo Othe - Udit Narayan, Sadhana Sargam
Kichhu Kichhu Kotha - Alka Yagnik
Gane Gane Sobar - Sadhana Sargam
Ami Hero Hobo - Kumar Sanu
Mon Meteche Mon - Udit Narayan, Sadhana Sargam

References

External links
 

2005 films
Bengali-language Indian films
Bengali remakes of Tamil films
2000s Bengali-language films
Films directed by Swapan Saha
Indian romantic drama films
Indian musical drama films
2000s musical drama films
2005 romantic drama films